Hayaghat Assembly constituency is an assembly constituency in Darbhanga district in the Indian state of Bihar.

Overview
As per Delimitation of Parliamentary and Assembly constituencies Order, 2008, No. 84 Hayaghat Assembly constituency is composed of the following: Hayaghat community development block; Athar North, Athar South, Baligaon, Bhachhi, Bithauli, Chakwa Bharwari, Dhanauli, Gangdah Shivram, Gujrauli Ramauli, Harhacha, Hathauri North, Hathauri South, Jorja, Mithunia, Nimaithi, Paghari, Susari Turki and Thathopur of Baheri CD Block.

Hayaghat Assembly constituency is part of No. 23 Samastipur (Lok Sabha constituency) (SC).

Members of Legislative Assembly

Election results

2020

2015

References

External links
 

Assembly constituencies of Bihar
Politics of Darbhanga district